Group A was one of two groups of the 2019 IIHF World Championship. The four best placed teams advanced to the playoff round, while the last placed team was relegated to Division I in 2020.

Standings

Matches
All times are local (UTC+2).

Finland vs Canada

United States vs Slovakia

Denmark vs France

Germany vs Great Britain

Slovakia vs Finland

United States vs France

Denmark vs Germany

Great Britain vs Canada

United States vs Finland

Slovakia vs Canada

Great Britain vs Denmark

Germany vs France

United States vs Great Britain

Germany vs Slovakia

Canada vs France

Finland vs Denmark

France vs Slovakia

Finland vs Great Britain

Denmark vs United States

Canada vs Germany

Great Britain vs Slovakia

Germany vs United States

France vs Finland

France vs Great Britain

Canada vs Denmark

Finland vs Germany

Slovakia vs Denmark

Canada vs United States

References

External links
Official website

A